Glücklich is a German family name which means "lucky".

Those with the surname include:
Vilma Glücklich (1872-1927), Hungarian educational reformer, pacifist and women's rights activist
Henryk Glücklich (1945-2014), motorcycle speedway rider who appeared in the Speedway World Championship
Jens Glücklich (1966), German cyclist at the 1992 Summer Olympics

German-language surnames

de:Glücklich